Hochschule für Musik und Theater may refer to:

 Hochschule für Musik und Theater Hamburg 
 Hochschule für Musik, Theater und Medien Hannover, formerly Hochschule für Musik und Theater Hannover
 University of Music and Theatre Leipzig
 Hochschule für Musik und Theater München
 Hochschule für Musik und Theater Rostock
 Zürcher Hochschule der Künste, a merger (2007) of the former Hochschule für Musik und Theater and Hochschule für Gestaltung und Kunst

See also
List of university and college schools of music